Rohdell Antonio Smith (born 28 March 1989) is an English footballer who plays as a midfielder for Hendon.

Club career
Gordon was born in the London Borough of Wandsworth and represented South London as a schoolboy, playing alongside Jordon Ibe. Gordon joined the youth system at Stevenage in 2010 as an under-15 player after impressing in an open trial. In the summer of 2012, Gordon started a two-year scholarship with the club. On his return to Stevenage in April 2014, Gordon was handed his professional debut in a 1–0 defeat to Sheffield United, replacing Lucas Akins as a substitute. In May 2014, after making three first team appearances, Gordon was handed his first professional contract on a one-year deal. Gordon made two further League One appearances for the club, against Bristol City and Walsall respectively.
In the ensuing 2015/16 season, Gordon made 4 League Two appearances for Stevenage, making his debut in the fourth against Hartlepool United.

He gained his first taste of senior football on loan at Isthmian Division One South side Walton Casuals. He made a single appearance for the club in December 2012.

In November 2013, Gordon joined Southern Football League Premier Division side Arlesey Town on work experience. He made his debut in a 2–1 defeat to Weymouth. Gordon returned to Stevenage in January 2014, having made six appearances for the club.

In March 2010, he joined Conference South side Bishop's Stortford on loan. He made his only appearance for the club came as a substitute in the 2–1 defeat to Gosport Borough.

In August 2014 he joined Chelmsford City on a loan until the end of the year, making his debut in a 0–0 draw against Bath City two days later. In January 2015, Gordon extended his loan deal until the end of the season with Chelmsford City.

On 13 February 2016, Gordon joined Bromley on loan, and made his first appearance for the Ravens on the same day, in a 2–0 defeat to Wrexham. He scored his first goal for the club on 1 March, in a 2–0 win over Welling United.

In July 2016, he joined National League side Braintree Town on a free transfer following his release from Stevenage.

Career statistics

References

External links

Rohdell Gordon at Footballdatabase
Rohdell Gordon at Aylesbury United

1996 births
Living people
Footballers from Tooting
English footballers
Association football midfielders
Walton Casuals F.C. players
Stevenage F.C. players
Arlesey Town F.C. players
Bishop's Stortford F.C. players
Chelmsford City F.C. players
Bromley F.C. players
Braintree Town F.C. players
Hemel Hempstead Town F.C. players
Hayes & Yeading United F.C. players
Ashford United F.C. players
Royston Town F.C. players
Kings Langley F.C. players
Hendon F.C. players
English Football League players
National League (English football) players
Southern Football League players
Black British sportspeople